191 (one hundred [and] ninety-one) is the natural number following 190 and preceding 192.

In mathematics
191 is a prime number, part of a prime quadruplet of four primes: 191, 193, 197, and 199. Because doubling and adding one produces another prime number (383), 191 is a Sophie Germain prime. It is the smallest prime that is not a full reptend prime in any base from 2 to 10; in fact, the smallest base for which 191 is a full period prime is base 19.

See also
 191 (disambiguation)

References 

Integers